INS Sagardhwani (A74) (Hindi : सागरध्वनि - Voice of the Sea) is a marine acoustic research ship (MARS) owned by the Naval Physical and Oceanographic Laboratory (NPOL), a DRDO laboratory and is maintained and operated by the Indian Navy, and based at Southern Naval Command, Kochi.

The ship was built by Garden Reach Shipbuilders & Engineers, Kolkata, launched in May 1991, and commissioned in 1994. It is similar in design to the Sandhayak-class survey ships, but with the superstructure positioned amidships and a helipad forward. The vessel is designed to facilitate low noise and low vibration while carrying out acoustic programmes. It has floating floors for scientific laboratories, anti-vibration mountings for machinery and equipment, balloon launching container and wind weather radar to carry out those experiments. It is also equipped with VHF sets, marine radio and auto telephone exchange.

Internally, the ship has eight laboratories for various scientific disciplines, and a mini-operating theatre with medical staff. At the stern is handling equipment for mooring and retrieving oceanographic and acoustic buoys. It can accommodate up to 82 persons, including 16 scientists, and a crew of 8 officers and 58 sailors.

See also
List of active Indian Navy ships

References

External links

Auxiliary ships of the Indian Navy
Research vessels of India
Ships built in India
1991 ships